Amethi Lok Sabha constituency is one of the 80 Lok Sabha constituencies in the state of Uttar Pradesh in India. It covers the entirety of the Amethi district and was created in 1967. The seat is considered to be one of the bastions of the Indian National Congress (INC). Rahul Gandhi held the seat for the longest period, from 2004 to 2019, but lost to Smriti Irani, resulting in the Bharatiya Janata Party (BJP) seizing the prestigious seat from the scion of Congress. The seat has also been held by his mother, father and uncle.

Its first member of parliament (MP) was Vidya Dhar Bajpai of INC, who was reelected in 1971. In the 1977 election, Ravindra Pratap Singh of the Janata Party became its MP. Singh was defeated in 1980 by Sanjay Gandhi of the INC. He died in a plane crash later that year, and a 1981 by-election was won by his brother, Rajiv Gandhi. Gandhi represented the constituency until 1991, when he was assassinated by the Liberation Tigers of Tamil Eelam (LTTE). The by-election held that year was won by Satish Sharma of the INC, who was reelected in 1996. Sanjay Singh of the BJP defeated Sharma in the 1998 election. The wife of Rajiv Gandhi, Sonia Gandhi, then represented the constituency from 1999 to 2004. She was succeeded by her son Rahul Gandhi. Amethi has thus been represented by four members of the Nehru–Gandhi family. However, this safe congress bastion was breached by Smriti Irani of the BJP in 2019 general elections.

Vidhan Sabha segments
Presently, Amethi Lok Sabha constituency comprises five Vidhan Sabha (legislative assembly) segments: Tiloi, Salon, Jagdishpur, Gauriganj and Amethi. This constituency is surrounded by Bara Banki and Faizabad in the north, Rae Bareli to the west, Sultanpur to the east and Pratapgarh to the south.

Members of Lok Sabha

^ by-poll

Election results

General election 1967
Vidya Dhar Bajpai of the INC won the first election in 1967 and became Amethi's first MP.

 ||

 ||

General election 1971
Bajpai held the seat and represented the constituency in the Fifth Lok Sabha.

General election 1977
Ravindra Pratap Singh of the Janata Party represented the constituency in the Sixth Lok Sabha.

General election 1980
Sanjay Gandhi of the INC won the election, but he died in a plane crash later in the year forcing a by-election in 1981.

By-election 1981
Rajiv Gandhi, Sanjay's brother, won the by-election and represented the constituency in the Seventh Lok Sabha.

General election 1984
Rajiv Gandhi held the seat and represented the constituency in the Eighth Lok Sabha. He was challenged by his sister-in-law Maneka Gandhi.

General election 1989
Rajiv Gandhi won a third term in the election and represented the constituency in the Ninth Lok Sabha. He was challenged by Rajmohan Gandhi, grandson of Mahatma Gandhi.

General election 1991
Rajiv Gandhi won the election, but he was assassinated on 21 May 1991 a few days after the polling in Amethi and even before other rounds of polling were completed. Election process was postponed for a few days and votes were eventually counted in June 1991. He was declared winner after his death, but a bye-election had to be called.

By-election 1991
Satish Sharma of the INC won the election and represented the constituency in the Ninth Lok Sabha.

General election 1996
Satish Sharma held the seat and represented the constituency in the Tenth Lok Sabha.

General election 1998
Sanjay Singh of the BJP won the election and represented the constituency in the Eleventh Lok Sabha.

General election 1999
Sonia Gandhi, the wife of Rajiv Gandhi, won the election and represented the constituency in the Thirteenth Lok Sabha.

General election 2004
Rahul Gandhi, Sonia Gandhi's son, won the seat and represented the constituency in the Fourteenth Lok Sabha.

General election 2009
Rahul Gandhi held the seat and represented the constituency in the Fifteenth Lok Sabha.

General election 2014
Rahul Gandhi won a third term as MP in the Sixteenth Lok Sabha.

General election 2019
Smriti Irani from the BJP won in the Seventeenth Lok Sabha.

See also
 Amethi district
 List of Constituencies of the Lok Sabha

External links
 Amethi Lok Sabha Election Results - From 1971 to Today
Amethi lok sabha  constituency election 2019 results

References

Lok Sabha constituencies in Uttar Pradesh
Amethi district